Puchalapalli Penchalaiah (15 November 1924 – 29 December 2018) was an Indian politician who was a member of the 7th, 8th and 9th Lok Sabhas of India. He represented the Nellore constituency in Andhra Pradesh. He was instrumental in developing schools and shelters for underprivileged people. He introduced the Seenaiah Sena Harijan Wing for the advancement of the lower sections of the society.

Early life and career
Penchalaiah was born on 15 November 1924, at the remote village of Pamanji in Nellore District, to P. Lakshmaiah and Papamma. He studied in a government board high school, which was approximately 10km from his village. He completed an M.A in Political Science from V. R. College, Nellore. 

Before venturing into politics, he was working as a clerk in local fund auditing department, later he resigned and helped his parents in farming. Due to his education, his fellow villagers urged him to enter politics to improve their lives.

Association with political parties 
Vice-President, District Congress Committee (I) Nellore, Andhra Pradesh; Vice-President, District Kisan Congress, Nellore, Andhra Pradesh; President, Seenaiah Sena Harijan Wing, Andhra Pradesh Congress (I); Member, Scheduled Castes Federation;

Electoral history 
 Seventh Lok Sabha, 1983–84
 Eighth Lok Sabha, 1984–89
 Ninth Lok Sabha, 1989–91

Committee experience 
 Member, Committee on Absence of Members from the Sittings of the House, 1984 
 Member, Committee on the Welfare of Scheduled Castes and Scheduled Tribes, 1985–86
 Member, Committee on Petitions, Consultative Committees, Works & Housing, Labour and Agriculture
 Member, Consultative Committee, Petroleum & Chemicals, 1990

Personal life 
Penchalaiah married Puchalapalli Chinna Subbamma, at the age of 30. They had three children.

He also had an interest in farming and social work. He was President of various organisations in Nellore, including the Deenabandhu Welfare Association, and the Boatmen Welfare Association.

Penchalaiah died in Gudur, Nellore on 29 December 2018, at the age of 94.

References

Sources
 
 
 
 

1924 births
2018 deaths
India MPs 1984–1989
India MPs 1989–1991
Indian National Congress politicians from Andhra Pradesh
Lok Sabha members from Andhra Pradesh
People from Nellore district